Punkeydoodles Corners is an unincorporated hamlet in southwestern Ontario, in Canada, known for its strange name
and frequent sign theft. Although primarily located in the township of Wilmot, the hamlet also straddles the municipal boundaries with East Zorra – Tavistock and Perth East, placing it in three different counties.

The origin of the name is somewhat disputed. Most claims date back to an inn and tavern located at the Corner during the late nineteenth century.  The most frequently cited legend, claims that the local German-speaking inn-keeper was given the name Punkey Doodle after he mispronounced the words of the song Yankee Doodle, which sounded more like "Punkey Doodle" to the tavern guests. Other stories link the name to an old Victorian nursery word for frittering away time, or a nickname given to a lazy pumpkin farmer by his irritated wife. There have been suggestions that pumpkins were an early crop locally. "Corners" refers to both the geographical feature of the intersecting roads as well as the convergence of Waterloo, Oxford, and Perth regional boundaries.

The most prominent moment in Punkeydoodles Corners history was Canada Day 1982, when Joe Clark was present for festivities. A post office was opened for one day to issue commemorative stamps.

While the spelling and punctuation vary in common usage, the version recognized by both Statistics Canada and the Canadian Geographical Names Data Base is "Punkeydoodles Corners".

The name of the hamlet frequently appears in lists of humorous place names.

See also

 List of unincorporated communities in Ontario

References

External links
Punkeydoodles Corners at Geographical Names of Canada.

Communities in the Regional Municipality of Waterloo
Wilmot, Ontario